Lüchow is a Samtgemeinde ("collective municipality") in the district of Lüchow-Dannenberg, in Lower Saxony, Germany. Its seat is in the town Lüchow.

The Samtgemeinde Lüchow consists of the following municipalities:

Bergen an der Dumme
Clenze
Küsten
Lemgow
Luckau (Wendland)
Lübbow
Lüchow
Schnega
Trebel
Waddeweitz
Woltersdorf
Wustrow

Samtgemeinden in Lower Saxony